Otto Lehner (20 August 1898 – 1977) was a Swiss cyclist. He competed in two events at the 1924 Summer Olympics.

References

External links
 

1898 births
1977 deaths
People from Aarau District
Swiss male cyclists
Olympic cyclists of Switzerland
Cyclists at the 1924 Summer Olympics
Sportspeople from Aargau